Rot(s) or rotting may refer to:

Decay

Organic matter
 Rot, decomposition of organic matter
 Dry rot, of wood 
 Root rot
 Wet rot, of wood
 Necrosis, of tissue

Technology
 Bit rot, data degradation
 Software rot, a form of bit rot
 Disk rot, also called CD Rot or DVD rot, the physical decay of optical disks
 Link rot, hyperlinks becoming broken

Film 

Rot (film), a 2019 horror drama film directed by Andrew Merrill

Music
 Rot (album), an album by German rapper Sabrina Setlur
 Rot (SITD), an album by the German band [:SITD:]
 Rotting (EP), by the Brazilian metal band Sarcofago
 "Rot", a song by Northlane in 2015 album Node
 "Rotting", a song by Green Day in 2002 album Shenanigans

Places
 Rot (Bad Mergentheim), a subdivision of the town of Bad Mergentheim in Baden-Württemberg, Germany
 Rot (Apfelstädt), a river of Thuringia, Germany
 Rot (Danube), a river in Upper Swabia, Germany
 Rot (Kocher), a river of Baden-Württemberg, Germany
 Rot an der Rot, a village on the Rot river, Baden-Württemberg, Germany
 Rot, Sweden, a village in the Älvdalen Municipality, Sweden

Other uses
 Rot (mathematics), rotation vector operator

See also
 ROT (disambiguation)
 ROTS (disambiguation)
 Roth (disambiguation)
 Rott (disambiguation)
 Rotten (disambiguation)